Jonathan Michael Caine, Baron Caine (born 1966, Leeds) is a British Member of the House of Lords and a former political aide (or "SPAD") who served six Secretaries of State.

Education and career 
Caine grew up in Leeds in the 1970s, and was educated at Halton Primary and Middle School, then Temple Moor High School. He studied history at the University of Leicester, where his specialism was the Home Rule Crisis and the Anglo-Irish Treaty.

He joined the Conservative Research Department in 1987, working in the office next to David Cameron's. He joined the party's Northern Ireland desk in 1988, and by 1991 was a special adviser at the Northern Ireland Office until 1995 – rejoining it in 2010.

In 2008, Caine stated that he was a Director at Bell Pottinger Public Affairs.

In 2014, Caine worked as special adviser to Theresa Villiers, being described in the press as her "right-hand man". Caine had also  worked for Owen Paterson, and was described by him as "one of the foremost experts on Northern Ireland". However, a senior member of the SDLP noted that, although he understood Unionism in Ireland, he had no real understanding of Irish republicanism, and no sympathy for it.

, Caine had worked for Tom King, Peter Brooke, Patrick Mayhew, Owen Paterson, Theresa Villiers and James Brokenshire.

Jonathan Caine has been described as "one of the most quietly brilliant Westminster strategists, whose knowledge of Northern Ireland is formidable." In his memoir, For The Record, former Prime Minister David Cameron is quoted in The Yorkshire Post as crediting Caine with being "an authority in his field and a tireless behind-the-scenes presence. He was – and remains – passionate about securing peace... in Northern Ireland, and maintaining our United Kingdom."

He was nominated for a life peerage as part of David Cameron's Resignation Honours list and was created Baron Caine, of Temple Newsam in the City of Leeds, on 2 September 2016.

On 5 November 2021, Caine was appointed as a Parliamentary Under-Secretary of State at the Northern Ireland Office. On 24 November 2022, he was appointed as a whip (Lord-in-waiting) in addition to his role the NIO.

Personal life 
Caine supports Yorkshire County Cricket Club and Leeds Rhinos, and enjoys listening to Led Zeppelin. He was a longstanding friend of David Trimble.

References 

1966 births
Living people
Alumni of the University of Leicester
Life peers
Conservative Party (UK) life peers
Life peers created by Elizabeth II
British special advisers